In February 1948, a team of Australian and American researchers and support staff came together in northern Australia to begin, what was then, one of the largest scientific expeditions ever to have taken place in Australia—the American-Australian Scientific Expedition to Arnhem Land (also known as the Arnhem Land Expedition). Today it remains one of the most significant, most ambitious and least understood expeditions ever mounted. 

Seventeen men and women journeyed across the remote region known as Arnhem Land in northern Australia for nine months. From varying disciplinary perspectives, and under the guidance of expedition leader Charles Mountford, they investigated the Indigenous populations and the environment of Arnhem Land. In addition to an ethnographer, archaeologist, photographer, and filmmaker, the expedition included a botanist, a mammalogist, an ichthyologist, an ornithologist, and a team of medical and nutritional scientists. Their first base camp was Groote Eylandt in the Gulf of Carpentaria. Three months later they moved to Yirrkala on the Gove Peninsula and three months following that to Oenpelli (now Gunbalanya) in west Arnhem Land. The journey involved the collaboration of different sponsors and partners (among them the National Geographic Society, the Smithsonian Institution, and various agencies of the Commonwealth of Australia). In the wake of the expedition came volumes of scientific publications, kilometres of film, thousands of photographs, tens of thousands of scientific specimens, and a vast array of artefacts and paintings from across Arnhem Land. The legacy of the 1948 Arnhem Land Expedition is vast, complex, and, at times, contentious. Human remains collected by Setzler and later held by the Smithsonian Institution have since been repatriated to Gunbalanya.

Expedition members
 Charles Pearcy Mountford - leader, ethnographer and film-maker, Honorary Associate Curator in Ethnology, South Australian Museum, Adelaide
 :de:Frank M. Setzler - Deputy Leader and Archaeologist, Head Curator, Department of Anthropology, National Museum of Natural History, Smithsonian Institution, Washington
 Herbert G Deignan - Ornithologist, Associate Curator of Birds, Smithsonian Institution, Washington
 David H. Johnson - Mammalogist, Curator of Mammals, Smithsonian Institution, Washington
 Robert R. Miller - Ichthyologist, Associate Curator of Fishes, Smithsonian Institution, Washington
 Raymond L Specht - Botanist, Lecturer, Department of Botany, University of Adelaide
 Frederick D McCarthy - Anthropologist, Department of Anthropology, Australian Museum, Sydney
 Harrison Howell Walker - Photographer and Staff Writer, National Geographic Society, Washington
 Bessie I Mountford - Honorary Secretary, wife of leader
 Brian Billington - Medical Officer, Institute of Anatomy, Canberra
 Margaret McArthur - Nutritionist, Institute of Anatomy, Canberra
 Kelvin Hodges - Biochemist, Institute of Anatomy, Canberra
 William E Harney - Guide and Liaison Officer
 Peter Bassett-Smith - Cine-Photographer
 Keith Cordon - Transport Officer
 John E Bray - Cook and Honorary Entomologist
 Reginald Hollow - Cook (2 months)

ABC reporters
Two staff members from ABC Radio also joined the expedition:
 Colin Simpson
 Raymond Frank Giles - Sound Recorder

Collections
 National Museum of Australia
 Australian Museum
 National Museum of Natural History, Smithsonian Institution
 Art Gallery of New South Wales
 South Australian Museum
 State Herbarium of South Australia
 Art Gallery of South Australia
 State Library of South Australia (literary collections)
 Tasmanian Museum and Art Gallery
 Art Gallery of Western Australia
 Queensland Art Gallery
 National Gallery of Victoria

Notes and references

Further reading
 Mountford, C. P. (Ed.). (1956). Records of the American-Australian Scientific Expedition to Arnhem Land, Vol. 1: Art, Myth and Symbolism. Melbourne: Melbourne University Press.
 Mountford, C. P. (Ed.). (1960). Records of the American-Australian Scientific Expedition to Arnhem Land, Vol. 2: Anthropology and Nutrition. Melbourne: Melbourne University Press.
 Mountford, C. P., and Specht, R. (Eds.). (1958). Records of the American-Australian Scientific Expedition to Arnhem Land, Vol. 3: Botany and Plant Ecology. Melbourne: Melbourne University Press.
 Specht, R. (Ed.). (1964). Records of the American-Australian scientific expedition to Arnhem Land, Vol. 4: Zoology. Melbourne: Melbourne University Press.
 May, Sally K. in press 2009. Collecting Indigenous Cultures: myth, politics and collaboration in the 1948 Arnhem Land Expedition. California: Altamira.
 May, Sally K. 2008  ‘The Art of Collecting: Charles Pearcy Mountford’. In Nicholas Peterson, Lindy Allen, and Louise Hamby, The Makers and Making of Indigenous Australian Museum Collections. Melbourne: Museum Victoria.
 May, Sally K. with Donald Gumurdul, Jacob Manakgu, Gabriel Maralngurra and Wilfred Nawirridj. 2005. 'You Write it Down and Bring it Back… That's What We Want" - Revisiting the 1948 Removal of Human Remains from Gunbalanya (Oenpelli), Australia', in Smith, Claire & Wobst, H. Martin (eds). Indigenous Peoples and Archaeology. London: Routledge.
 May, Sally K. 2005 ‘Collecting the ‘Last Frontier’’, in Hamby, Louise (ed). Twined Together. Melbourne: Museum Victoria.
 May, Sally K, Jennifer McKinnon and Jason Raupp, 2009. ‘Boats on Bark: an analysis of Groote Eylandt bark paintings featuring Macassan praus from the 1948 Arnhem Land Expedition’, International Journal of Nautical Archaeology.
 May, Sally K. 2003 'Colonial Collections of Portable Art and Intercultural Encounters in Aboriginal Australia', in Paul Faulstich, Sven Ouzman, and Paul S.C. Taçon (eds), Before Farming: the archaeology and anthropology of hunter-gatherers. California: Altamira. 1, 8, p. 1-17.
 May, Sally K. 2000. The Last Frontier? Acquiring the American-Australian Scientific Expedition Ethnographic Collection 1948, Unpublished B.A. (Honours) Thesis, Flinders University of South Australia.
 Neale, Margo. 1993 'Charles Mountford and the 'Bastard Barks' A Gift from the American-Australian Scientific Expedition to Arnhem Land, 1948. In Lynne Seear & Julie Ewington, Brought to Light, Australian Art 1850 - 1965, From the Queensland Art Gallery Collection. Brisbane: Queensland Art Gallery.
 Brittain, N. (1990). The South Australian Museum collection of Aboriginal bark paintings from Northern Australia. Unpublished Honors BA Thesis, Flinders University of South Australia, Adelaide.
 Calwell, A. (1978). Be just and fear not. Adelaide: Rigby Limited.
 Clarke, A. (1998). Engendered fields: The language of the 1948 American-Australian expedition to Arnhem Land. In Redefining Archaeology, Feminist Perspectives. Canberra: North Australia Research Unit.
 Florek, S. (1993). F. D. McCarthy’s string figures from Yirrkala: A museum perspective. Records of the Australian Museum, Supplement 17, pp. 117–24.
 Johnson, D. H. (1955). The incredible kangaroo. National geographic, 108(4), 487–500.
 Walker, H. (1949). Cruise to Stone Age Arnhem Land. National Geographic, 96(3), 417–30.
 Jones, C. (1987). The toys of the American Australian Scientific Expedition to Arnhem Land ethnographic collection. Unpublished Diploma Thesis, University of Sydney, Sydney.
 Lamshed, M. (1972). Monty: A biography of CP. Mountford. Adelaide: Rigby.
 McArthur, M., Billington, B. P., and Hodges, K. J. (2000). Nutrition and health (1948) of Aborigines in settlements in Arnhem Land, northern Australia. Asia Pacific journal of clinical nutrition, 9(3), 164–213.
 McArthur, M., McCarthy, F., and Specht, R. (2000). Nutrition studies (1948) of nomadic Aborigines in Arnhem Land, northern Australia. Asia Pacific Journal of clinical nutrition, 9(3), 215–23.
 Simpson, C. (1951). Adam in Ochre: Inside Aboriginal Australia. Sydney: Angus and Robertson.

External links
 National Museum of Australia Audio on Demand: Barks, Birds and Billabongs: Exploring the Legacy of the 1948 American-Australian Scientific Expedition to Arnhem Land, International Symposium held at the National Museum of Australia 16–20 November 2009
 State Library of South Australia: Mountford-Sheard Collection

1940s in the Northern Territory
Arnhem Land
Arnhem Land expedition
Arnhem Land expedition